Porto of My Childhood (Portuguese: Porto da Minha Infância) is a 2001 Portuguese/French film directed by Manoel de Oliveira. Manoel de Oliveira narrates a documentary which features staged dramatic scenes of memories and stories told to him during his childhood in Porto.

Cast
 Jorge Trêpa - Manoel 1
 Ricardo Trêpa - Manoel 2
 Maria de Medeiros - Miss Diabo
 Manoel de Oliveira - Himself / narrator / The Thief
 José Wallenstein - Joel
 Rogério Samora - Chico
 Nelson Freitas - Diogo
 Jorge Loureiro - Casais Monteiro
 António Costa - Rodrigues de Freitas
 José Maria Vaz da Silva - António Silva
 David Cardoso - Augusto Nobre
 Leonor Baldaque - Ela
 Leonor Silveira - Vamp
 António Fonseca - Rufia
 Nuno Sousa - Reis' assistant
 Agustina Bessa-Luís - Dama texto
 João Bénard da Costa - A man (as Duarte de Almeida)
 Estela Cunha - Mãe

References

External links 
 

2001 films
2001 documentary films
Documentary films about cities
Films directed by Manoel de Oliveira
Portuguese-language films
Culture in Porto
French documentary films
Portuguese documentary films
Autobiographical documentary films
2000s French films